Santa Catarina Municipality may refer to:
 Santa Catarina Municipality, Nuevo León
 Santa Catarina, Cape Verde

Municipality name disambiguation pages